Josip Pankretić (15 January 1933 – 10 January 1998) was a Croatian politician. He was parliament representative and one of the leaders of Croatian Peasant Party (HSS) during the last decade of the 20th century.

His son Božidar (born 1964) is also a Croatian Peasant party politician and a Minister of Agriculture in Ivo Sanader's government.

Sources

1933 births
1998 deaths
Croatian Peasant Party politicians
Representatives in the modern Croatian Parliament